The Mundanes were an early-1980s Rhode Island-based new wave band with six members: John Andrews, Marsha Armitage, Jonathan Gregg, Dean Lozow, and Kevin Tooley, and John Linnell.

Marsha Armitage was the lead vocalist.  The band was  initially based in Providence (several of the band members attended Brown University) and played locally in the Boston-Providence area.  The band generated tremendous energy and had a devoted following, but struggled to sign to a record label. In 1981, the band relocated to New York City. Shortly thereafter, John Linnell left the band to pursue another musical project, They Might Be Giants, with John Flansburgh.  Drummer Kevin Tooley was replaced by Peter Clemente, and Jim Gillson replaced John Linnell on keyboards.  The band continued to gig in New England and played frequently in New York City venues, including CBGB.   David Hemming, who had previously managed Pat Travers and Ozzy Osbourne, took on the band's management.  They recorded a demo at RCA Studios, produced by Mick Ronson, that attracted record label attention, but the band remained unsigned and ultimately broke up in mid-1983.

References

External links
The Mundanes on This Might Be A Wiki
Museum of Idiots

American new wave musical groups
Musical groups from Rhode Island
They Might Be Giants